Louis Jacquinot (16 September 1898 – 14 June 1993) was a French lawyer and politician, and chief of Prime Minister Raymond Poincaré's office.

Jacquinot was born in Gondrecourt-le-Château (Meuse) in 1898.  Entering parliament in 1932, he later served for a short time as under-secretary of state for home affairs in Paul Reynaud's cabinet (1940).  He served in the army World War II and followed General de Gaulle to London.  He served as High Commissioner for the Navy in the provisional governments at Algiers and Paris, Minister of State for Muslim Affairs (1945), Minister of Marine (Navy) (1947), Minister of Veterans and War Victims (1949), Minister of Overseas France (1951–52 and 1953–54).

After de Gaulle's return to power in 1958, he was appointed Minister of State in charge of scientific research and afterwards for the Sahara.  As Minister of State, he was part of a "study group" formed by de Gaulle with the purpose of devising a constitution for the Fifth Republic.  Later he again held the position of Minister for Overseas France (1961–66). He also chaired the General Council of the Meuse department in the Lorraine Province.  A moderate right-wing politician during the Third and Fourth Republics, during the de Gaulle era, he voted with Giscard d'Estaing's independent republicans and later as a member of the Gaullist Union of Democrats for the Fifth Republic. He left parliament in 1973.  Jacquinot married the wife of former Finance Minister Maurice Petsche in order to be elected president that year, but he was homosexual. He died in Paris in 1993.

References

 Lacouture, Jean, De Gaulle: The Ruler 1945-1970.  Alan Sheridan, trans., New York: 1991.    p. 174

1898 births
1993 deaths
People from Meuse (department)
Politicians from Grand Est
Republican Centre politicians
Democratic Republican Alliance politicians
Republican Party of Liberty politicians
National Centre of Independents and Peasants politicians
Union for the New Republic politicians
Union of Democrats for the Republic politicians
Ministers of Marine
French Ministers of Veterans Affairs
French Ministers of Overseas France
Members of the 15th Chamber of Deputies of the French Third Republic
Members of the 16th Chamber of Deputies of the French Third Republic
Members of the Constituent Assembly of France (1945)
Members of the Constituent Assembly of France (1946)
Deputies of the 1st National Assembly of the French Fourth Republic
Deputies of the 2nd National Assembly of the French Fourth Republic
Deputies of the 3rd National Assembly of the French Fourth Republic
Deputies of the 1st National Assembly of the French Fifth Republic
Deputies of the 2nd National Assembly of the French Fifth Republic
Deputies of the 3rd National Assembly of the French Fifth Republic
Deputies of the 4th National Assembly of the French Fifth Republic
French people of the Algerian War
LGBT conservatism
LGBT legislators in France
20th-century French lawyers
Gay politicians
20th-century French LGBT people